Vice Admiral Emmett Hulcy Tidd (October 6, 1923 – March 20, 2018) was a flag officer of the United States Navy.

Early life and education
Tidd was born in Shreveport, Louisiana, on October 6, 1923. After graduating from Central High School in Oklahoma City, Oklahoma, he attended the University of Oklahoma at Norman; his college time was cut short due to his early commissioning, and he completed his bachelor's degree in 1948.

Naval career
Tidd enlisted in the Navy Reserve as a seaman apprentice in 1942, and joined the Naval Reserve Officers Training Corps while at Oklahoma University. Commissioned an ensign in 1945, he was assigned to the pre-commissioning crew attached to the destroyer , and became that ship's assistant first lieutenant and damage control officer upon its commissioning on July 2, 1945. He departed Gyatt in 1946, and left active duty to complete his degree, continuing in the Naval Reserve.

While aboard Evans, he participated in the Siege of Wonsan in 1951. He served in the Officer Procurement Office in the Bureau of Naval Personnel from March 1952 to April 1954, and was selected for transfer to the active duty force during this time. Upon completing his tour at BUPERS, he served as operations officer aboard , participating in the evacuation of the Tachen Islands off the coast of China. While aboard Radford, Tidd was assigned as antisubmarine warfare and gunnery officer on the staff of Escort Destroyer Squadron One. After completing his command tour aboard Force, he attended the Naval War College Command and Staff Course from August 1958 to June 1959, and afterwards served in the Strategic Plans Division in the Office of the Chief of Naval Operations, the first of two tours in that division.

While in command of Anderson, the ship participated in Operation Swordfish, standing duty as the standby firing ship and surface scientific camera party platform for the first-ever firing of an ASROC anti-submarine rocket equipped with a nuclear warhead. Anderson also deployed to the Eastern Pacific during the Cuban Missile Crisis.

Tidd was promoted to rear admiral in 1970, and served, as a rear admiral designee, as Special Assistant to the Chief of Naval Operations (by then now-Admiral Elmo Zumwalt) and Vice Chief of Naval Operations for Decision Coordination (OP-09C), a position he held from June 1970 to August 1971. Upon leaving Washington, he assumed command of Cruiser Destroyer Flotilla Six, and embarked aboard  as Commander Task Group 56.2 and Commander Task Group 502.2. In April 1972, Tidd assumed command of Navy Recruiting Command, and was tasked with preparing for the transition to an all-volunteer force. He was promoted to vice admiral in 1974, and remained in his position as NRC commander. In June 1975, Todd assumed command of Naval Surface Force, Pacific Fleet; while serving in this position, the Navy completed efforts to combine all Pacific Fleet surface, amphibious, and SEAL forces under the SURFPAC umbrella.

Retirement
Vice Admiral Tidd retired in August 1976. After retiring, he served on the board of directors for Atlas Van Lines and the Armed Services YMCA, serving as the latter's chairman in 1981 and 1982. He died on March 20, 2018, at the age of 94.

Awards
Tidd's awards include:

 Distinguished Service Medal with two gold stars
 Legion of Merit
 Navy Commendation Medal with two gold stars and Combat V
 Navy Unit Commendation with star
 Naval Reserve Medal
 American Campaign Medal
 World War 2 Victory Medal
 China Service Medal
 National Defense Service Medal with bronze star
 Korean Service Medal with three stars
 United Nations Service Medal
 Vietnam Service Medal

Personal life
Tidd married his wife Margaret in 1945. His sons also became Navy flag officers; Kurt Tidd is a retired admiral (2018), and Mark Tidd retired in 2014 as a rear admiral and Chief of Navy Chaplains. A daughter in law also served in the Navy.

References

1923 births
2018 deaths
United States Navy personnel of the Korean War
United States Navy personnel of the Vietnam War
United States Navy personnel of World War II
Military personnel from Louisiana
People from Shreveport, Louisiana
Recipients of the Legion of Merit
Recipients of the Navy Distinguished Service Medal
United States Navy admirals
University of Oklahoma alumni